Austria has a well-developed institutional and legal system, and most corruption cases under investigation by a parliamentary committee end with judicial trials and effective judgments. However, there are several significant Austrian corruption cases which have taken place during the past decade involving land and regional officials, high-level public officials, the central government and, in one instance, the former Chancellor.

On Transparency International's 2022 Corruption Perceptions Index, Austria scored 71 on a scale from 0 ("highly corrupt") to 100 ("very clean"). When ranked by score, Austria ranked 22nd among the 180 countries in the Index, where the country ranked first is perceived to have the most honest public sector.  For comparison, the best score was 90 (ranked 1), and the worst score was 12 (ranked 180).

In most cases, corrupt practices were related to conflicts of interest, abuse of office, money laundering and influence peddling. The corruption scandals have put into doubt the ethical standards of the political elite. This doubt is reflected in the findings of Eurobarometer 2012, where two-thirds of respondents perceive national politicians to be corrupt and also the most corrupt institution in Austria.

Extent 
According to several sources, corruption is not considered a problem for doing business in Austria. According to Investment Climate Report 2013 by the US Department of State 2013, corruption is not considered as a serious problem impeding business in Austria. The World Economic Forum's Global Competitiveness 2013-2014 report notes that it is uncommon for companies to make irregular payments or bribes connected with imports and exports, public utilities, annual tax payments, and awarding of public contracts and licenses. Moreover, corruption is ranked as the twelfth most problematic factor for doing business in Austria.

According to the Global Competitiveness Report 2013–2014, favouritism among government officials towards well-connected companies and individuals is a competitive disadvantage for the country. According to Identifying and Reducing Corruption in Public Procurement in the EU 2013, officials involved in public procurement lack effective corruption screening.

A study over the years 2013 to 2019 found that Austria had the highest rate of corruption in healthcare of all EU countries, with one in nine Austrian patients being asked to pay bribes.

Affairs in recent history
The following corruption complexes caused a great public and media stir in Austria's recent history, mainly due to the involvement of political functionaries:
 AKH-Skandal (AKH Affair), surfacing 1980, which revolved around the construction of Austria's largest hospital, the Wiener Allgemeines Krankenhaus (Vienna General Hospital) in the 1970s. 
Noricum-Skandal (Noricum scandal) was an Austrian arms export scandal centering on the illegal export of weapons to Iran during the 1980s. 
Eurofighter-Affäre (Eurofighter Affair), surfacing 2006, is referring to a procurement process for fighter jets. 
BUWOG-Affäre (BUWOG Affair), surfacing 2009, which originated from a 2003 privatisation process around a large housing portfolio owned by the Republic of Austria. 
Hypo Alpe Adria, a complex of mismanagement and suspected corruption around a former state bank, surfacing 2009.
Telekom-Affäre (Telekom Austria Affair), surfacing 2011, included share price manipulation, unauthorised election campaign donations, influencing the awarding of contracts, questionable sponsoring and unclear company takeovers between 2000 and 2007.
Tetron-Affäre (Tetron Affair), surfacing 2011, involves possible money laundering, illegal lobbying, party financing and commission payments in connection with the procurement of a new federal digital radio systems for authorities and emergency forces in the early 2000s.
Ibiza-Affäre (Ibiza Affair), which was triggered 2019 by the publication of a 2017 secretly recorded video of the Austrian Vice Chancellor.

See also 
 Crime in Austria
 Police corruption in Austria

References

External links
Austria Corruption Profile from the Business Anti-Corruption Portal

 
Austria
Crime in Austria by type
Politics of Austria